Michael Dale Barber, Jr. (born June 19, 1967) is a former American football wide receiver who played college football at Marshall University.  He was inducted into the College Football Hall of Fame in 2005. Drafted in the 4th round (pick 112) by the San Francisco 49ers, he went on to play 4 seasons in the NFL. Inducted into the West Virginia Sports Hall of Fame in 2020.

High school
A multi-sport athlete at Winfield High School (WV) playing football, basketball, & track. Was a quarterback, free safety, kicker, punter, and kick returner. Earned 1st Team All-State honors as a defensive back in both his junior and senior seasons. He accepted a scholarship to play football at Marshall University as a wide receiver.

College 
Holds Marshall University's All-Time Records: Career Receiving Yards 4,262 and Most Games with 100 or more Receiving Yards with 21. Ranks 2nd in Single Season Receiving Yards 1,757 and receptions 106

1988 I-AA National Player of the Year, selected by the American Football Coaches Association.

Inducted into the College Football Hall of Fame in 2005.
Named Marshall's Athlete of the Decade (1980s) by the Herald Dispatch.
Inducted into Marshall's Hall of Fame in 1994.
Averaged 17.1 yards per catch throughout his career.
In 1987, was the NCAA statistical leader with 106 receptions, 1,757 yards, & 11 touchdowns.
In both 1987 & 1988, consensus I-AA 1st Team All-American.
Caught at least three passes in 39 consecutive games. A quarterback in high school, he also threw four touchdown passes at MU on backward lateral plays.

Pro 
1989 – Selected by the Super Bowl Champion San Francisco 49ers in the 4th round of the NFL draft. This was Marshall's highest round draft pick ever until Randy Moss was taken in the 1st round in 1998. One of only five rookies to make the roster. Backed up all-pro receivers Jerry Rice and John Taylor.

1990–1991 - Opted for Plan B free agency and signed with the Cincinnati Bengals in the off season. Emerged as the 3rd receiver often working out of the slot position. Started two games as wide receiver, backup punt returner, & special teams.

1992 – Began the season on injured reserve (shoulder separation.) Was released mid season by the Bengals & signed two days later by the Tampa Bay Buccaneers. Played in one game as Buc catching one pass for 37 yards and injuring his shoulder again. Retired from football in spring 1993.

Personal
Resides in Hurricane, West Virginia, with his wife Amy. They have four children, Brett, Abby, Chloe, & Audrey. Works as a Regional Manager for Brechbuhler Scales, Inc. Mike & Amy are assistant coaches for the Hurricane High School girls' soccer team, the West Virginia AAA 2018 state champions.

References

External links
 Marshall Thundering Herd football statistical leaders#Receiving yards
 
 List of Marshall Thundering Herd in the NFL Draft
 List of people from West Virginia
 https://www.herald-dispatch.com/sports/marshall_plane_crash/football_history/marshall-football-greats/article_4e48ee4b-e51f-57f5-9bcb-5633eb630836.html

1967 births
Living people
American football wide receivers
Marshall Thundering Herd football players
San Francisco 49ers players
Cincinnati Bengals players
Tampa Bay Buccaneers players
College Football Hall of Fame inductees
People from Putnam County, West Virginia
Players of American football from West Virginia